Horst Gnas (born 3 September 1941) is a retired German cyclist who specialized in motor-paced racing. In this discipline he won the UCI Motor-paced World Championships in 1971-1973 and finished second in 1970. He teamed with the famous Dutch pacer Bruno Walrave. 

His wife was fatally injured in a car accident while he was competing at the 1973 World Championships, leaving him with two daughters of eight and ten years old. Gnas retired from competitions in 1977 due to injuries, remarried, and opened two cleaning companies in Nuremberg and Röthenbach an der Pegnitz. His second wife Renata died in October 2008 of a sudden organ failure.

References

1941 births
Living people
German male cyclists
People from Dessau-Roßlau
Cyclists from Saxony-Anhalt
East German male cyclists
East German emigrants to West Germany